CA1P may refer to:
 Combretastatin A1 diphosphate, a drug under phase I clinical trial
 2-Carboxy-D-arabitinol 1-phosphate, a substrate of CA1P-phosphatase and an inhibitor of the enzyme RuBisCO